Cuentos Chinos is a Spanish rock music band, one of the many who took part in the movida madrileña during the 1980s in Spain. The band is from Vila-real (Villarreal) and consists of Enrique Renau (voice and guitar), Alejandro Carda (keyboards) and Juan Enrique Torner (bass guitar and backing vocals).

History
In 1985, the band took part in the first Pop-Rock contest organized by the Castellón council, and won the first prize, which allowed them to record their first maxi-single, along with two other groups from the regione. The songs they recorded were "Aquel verano en Benicasim" (That summer on Benicasim) and "Solo es" (It's only).

They subsequently recorded a demo which they sent to Madrid, signed a contract with PM Records (now defunct) and recorded two albums.

In 1987 they released Debajo de un pino (Under a pine tree). The album was produced by Javier Losada (who soon after formed the duo Veni Vidi Vici with Daniel Maroto, releasing their first album Alea jacta est). The most famous song from Debajo de un pino was undoubtedly "Cuatro Mexicanos" (Four Mexicans), which received high rotation, even in "Los 40 principales".

From this album they released three singles. The first was "Cuatro Mexicanos"/"Vivo en la mina" (I live in the mine), followed by "Tu serás mi beibi" (You'll be my baby)/"Te Quiero Loro" (Love you parrot) and "Es por la mañana, el niño sale de la cabaña con su caña para ir a pescar" (Early morning the kid leaves his cabin just to go fishing)/"San Serenín".

In 1988, they released their second and last album Cómo me pone tu celulitis (How I love your cellulite). It was a work in the same genre as the previous, but it was totally ignored.

Discography
1985: Aquel verano en Benicasim /Solo es (maxi single)
1987: Debajo de un pino
1989: Cómo me pone tu celulitis

References

Spanish rock music groups